Alice Volpi (born 15 April 1992) is an Italian right-handed foil fencer, two-time team European champion, 2017 team world champion, 2018 individual world champion, and 2020 team Olympic bronze medalist.

Biography
Born to a father from Siena, Paolo, and a Brazilian mother, Waléria Nunes da Silva, originally from Rio de Janeiro, Alice Volpi was raised at the Fencing Section of the University Sports Centre of Siena under the guidance of Maestro Daniele Giannini. She is now part of the sports group of the State Police "Fiamme Oro".

Medal Record

Olympic Games

World Championship

European Championship

Grand Prix

World Cup

Notes

External links
 
 

1992 births
Living people
Italian people of Brazilian descent
People of Tuscan descent
Italian female foil fencers
Sportspeople from Siena
Universiade medalists in fencing
Universiade silver medalists for Italy
Universiade bronze medalists for Italy
Fencers at the 2015 European Games
European Games medalists in fencing
European Games gold medalists for Italy
European Games bronze medalists for Italy
Fencers of Fiamme Oro
Medalists at the 2013 Summer Universiade
Fencers at the 2020 Summer Olympics
Olympic fencers of Italy
Medalists at the 2020 Summer Olympics
Olympic bronze medalists for Italy
Olympic medalists in fencing
21st-century Italian women
World Fencing Championships medalists